is a Japanese manga series that spans 16 volumes. Many of the shots portrayed in the series are based on actual billiards principles, though they are highly dramatized and sometimes ignore principles of physics.

Plot
The story initially focuses on Oda's desire to publicize the pool-playing club at his high school. Eventually the focus shifts to Oda's climb up the pool tournament circuits and his desire to master new skills and invent new shots.

Characters
Oda Shinsuke
The main protagonist of the series, Oda is a high school student that is obsessed with pool. At the start of the series, he was the only member of his school's pool club. He is a very focused individual and displays amazing talent in pool. Oda would constantly invent creative methods of escaping from difficult situations while playing against other pool players.
Initially his specialty is the "jump shot" but as the story progresses he uses more varied and sometimes even exotic moves.
In some translations named "Chinmi".

Hayakawa Asako
She is the student body president at the same high school as Oda. When they first met, she came to the pool club to disband it for lack of members and lack of school funding. After Oda showed his skills to her, he convinced her that the club was worth keeping and she even became a member.
In some translations named "Olive".

Kanou Ryouji
One of Japan's best Billiard players, and is known as "three moves Ryoji" because he always defeats an opponent in only three moves. He is left handed, but is also an excellent player with his right hand.
His specialty is the "shotgun shot", which launches the cue ball so hard it shatters on impact, scattering the pieces to hit the balls surrounding it.

Aono Minoru
Another of Oda's friends, his specialty is hitting with an accurate back shot that returns the cue to the center of the table, enabling him to keep shooting from a good vantage point.

Aki
Yet another of Oda's endless friends he picked up in his first tournament, he relies on his powerful "Massé" to cause chain reactions at an angle. however, because of his power his accuracy is a bit on the low side (compared to the pros, of course).

Jeffery Boid
The main rival in the Japan-USA high-school tournament situated in Hawaii, his specialty is the "miracle shot" that uses the cushion of air of the cue, spinning at 210 km/h, to spin around other balls. The human eye finds it hard to follow movement at this speed and so it appears as if the cue goes through the other ball.
He has another specialty, the "hurricane shot", which also uses the air cushion of the spinning cue but uses it to direct move other balls without actually touching them.

See also

 Ironfist Chinmi

References

External links
 

1987 manga
Ball games in anime and manga
Cue sports literature
Shōnen manga